Jerónimo (European Portuguese and Spanish) or Jerônimo (Brazilian Portuguese) may refer to:

 Jerónimo (name), a given or surname, Jerome in English
 Jeronimo (singer) (born 1990), Dutch pop singer and actor 
 Jeronimo (band), German band of the 1970s
 Jeronimo: The Untold Tale of Koreans in Cuba, a documentary film Jeronimo Lim Kim
 A character in The Baroque Cycle by Neal Stephenson
 A variant spelling of Geronimo, Apache leader
 Jerônimo, a Brazilian indigenous politician

See also 
 San Jerónimo (disambiguation)
 
 Jerome (disambiguation)
 Saint Jerome (disambiguation)
 Geronimo (disambiguation)
 San Geronimo (disambiguation)
 Geronimus (disambiguation)
 Hieronymus (disambiguation)